Muferihat Kamil Ahmed (Amharic: ሙፈሪሃት ካሚል አሕመድ, mufärihat kamil ähmäd; born 1976) is an Ethiopian politician who is the current Ministry of Labour and Skills Development in Ethiopia. She was the Speaker of the House of People's Representatives. Muferihat previously served as the first Minister of Peace from October 2018 to  6 October 2021. She was the Chair of the SEPDM (Southern Ethiopian People's Democratic Movement), one of the four parties that make up the former ruling coalition in Ethiopia, the EPRDF.

Early life
Muferihat was born in Jimma to  ethnic Silt’e parents, one of southern Ethiopian peoples. She is a Sunni Muslim. She attended Haramaya University, obtaining her BSc in Agriculture in 2000.

Political career 
Muferihat was appointed Public Relations Advisor to the Southern Nations, Nationalities and Peoples' Region (SNNPR) President in 2007. She was named as Minister of Women's Affairs of Ethiopia in 2008. She was named as Speaker of the House of People's Representatives in April 2018, making her the first female to hold the post.

In October 2018, Muferihat was appointed Minister of Peace, a powerful ministry overseeing agencies including the National Intelligence and Security Service (NISS), the Information Network Security Agency (INSA), and the Federal Police Commission.

References

Living people
Southern Ethiopian People's Democratic Movement politicians
1976 births
Speakers of the House of Peoples' Representatives (Ethiopia)
Government ministers of Ethiopia
Women government ministers of Ethiopia
Ethiopian Muslims
Female interior ministers
21st-century Ethiopian politicians
21st-century Ethiopian women politicians